Mohammed Rabia Jamaan Al-Noobi (born 10 May 1981), commonly known as Mohammed Rabia, is an Omani footballer who plays for Dhofar S.C.S.C.

Club career statistics

International career
Mohammed was part of the first team squad of the Oman national football team from 2001 to 2010. He was selected for the national team for the first time in 2001. He has made appearances in the 2003 Gulf Cup of Nations, the 2004 Gulf Cup of Nations, the 2004 AFC Asian Cup qualification, the 2004 AFC Asian Cup, the 2007 Gulf Cup of Nations, the 2007 AFC Asian Cup qualification, the 2007 AFC Asian Cup, the 2010 Gulf Cup of Nations and the 2011 AFC Asian Cup qualification.

FIFA World Cup Qualification
Mohammed has made seven appearances in the 2002 FIFA World Cup qualification, five in the 2006 FIFA World Cup qualification and five in the 2010 FIFA World Cup qualification.

References

External links
 
 
 
 

1981 births
Living people
Omani footballers
Oman international footballers
Omani expatriate footballers
Association football defenders
2004 AFC Asian Cup players
2007 AFC Asian Cup players
Dhofar Club players
Kazma SC players
Al-Wehda Club (Mecca) players
Al Sadd SC players
Al Ahli SC (Doha) players
Saudi Professional League players
Qatar Stars League players
Expatriate footballers in Kuwait
Omani expatriate sportspeople in Kuwait
Expatriate footballers in Saudi Arabia
Omani expatriate sportspeople in Saudi Arabia
Expatriate footballers in Qatar
Omani expatriate sportspeople in Qatar
Footballers at the 2006 Asian Games
Asian Games competitors for Oman
Kuwait Premier League players